The 6th Legislative Assembly of British Columbia sat from 1891 to 1894. The members were elected in the British Columbia general election held in June 1890. John Robson served as premier until his death in 1892. Theodore Davie succeeded Robson as premier.

There were four sessions of the 6th Legislature:

David Williams Higgins served as speaker.

Members of the 6th General Assembly 
The following members were elected to the assembly in 1891:

Notes:

By-elections 
By-elections were held for the following members appointed to the provincial cabinet, as was required at the time:
 James Baker Minister of Education and Immigration, acclaimed July 30, 1892

By-elections were held to replace members for various other reasons:

Notes:

References 

Political history of British Columbia
Terms of British Columbia Parliaments
1891 establishments in British Columbia
1894 disestablishments in British Columbia
19th century in British Columbia